The R 7.1 Motorway (Serbian: Autoput R 7.1) is a motorway in the Republic of Kosovo, running  in the districts of Gjilan and Pristina.

It is projected to cost around €260 million ended up being twice less,the motorway links the capital Pristina with the Serbian border at Dheu i Bardhë. The motorway is also known under the name Autostrada Prishtinë–Gjilan. Construction begun in April 2018, with the first segment of 22.3 km set to open at the end of the second Kurti Government.

See also 
 Motorways in Kosovo
 Transport in Kosovo
 Economy of Kosovo

Notes

References 

Roads in Kosovo
Motorways in Kosovo 
Transport in Pristina District
District of Gjilan
Pan-European Corridor VIII